Discherodontus parvus is a species of cyprinid in the genus Discherodontus. It inhabits China and is used locally for food.

References

Cyprinidae
Freshwater fish of China
Cyprinid fish of Asia
Taxa named by Wu Hsien-Wen
Taxa named by Lin Ren-Duan
Fish described in 1977